Vernon Maxwell (born September 12, 1965) is an American former professional basketball player who was a shooting guard in the National Basketball Association (NBA) for thirteen seasons during the late 1980s, 1990s, and early 2000s.  Maxwell played college basketball for the University of Florida, and led the Florida Gators to their first-ever NCAA tournament appearance.  He was selected by the Denver Nuggets in the second round of the 1988 NBA Draft and was immediately traded to the San Antonio Spurs. His longest and most successful NBA tenure was with the Houston Rockets. The nickname "Mad Max" was bestowed upon Maxwell by color commentators for his clutch three-point shooting, which reached its pinnacle in the deciding game of the 1994 NBA Finals between Houston and New York. Maxwell is among just nine players in NBA history to amass 30 points in a single quarter, accomplishing that feat en route to a 51-point outing on January 26, 1991, against Cleveland.

Early years
Maxwell was born in Gainesville, Florida.  He attended Buchholz High School in Gainesville, and played for the Buchholz Bobcats high school basketball team.  As a senior, Maxwell was the Mr. Basketball of the state of Florida as well as being an all-state defensive back in football.

College career
Maxwell received an athletic scholarship to attend the University of Florida, where he played for coach Norm Sloan's Florida Gators men's basketball from 1984 to 1988.  The 6-foot-4 guard averaged 20.2 points as a senior and still holds 15 Gators team records. He left school after four years as the Gators' all-time leading scorer (2,450) and the No. 2 scorer in Southeastern Conference history behind LSU's Pete Maravich. He averaged more than 20 points in both his junior and senior seasons, although Florida would erase all the points Maxwell scored in those seasons due to Maxwell taking money from agents and accepting a free round-trip ticket to go to a basketball camp.

Professional career
On June 28, 1988, Maxwell was drafted into the NBA by the Denver Nuggets, who traded him the same day to the San Antonio Spurs for a second-round pick the next year. Two years later, his contract was sold to the Houston Rockets for $50,000, where he would become a key member of the franchise's first championship team in 1994. Known for his clutch shooting, Maxwell hit several game-winning shots throughout his career. Maxwell held the NBA's record for most 3-pointers made in a season from 1991 to 1993. In January 1991, he became the fourth player to score 30 points in a quarter when he scored 30 of his career high 51 points in the fourth quarter of the Rockets 103-97 win against the Cleveland Cavaliers. Maxwell was not a part of the Rockets' 1995 championship roster, quitting the team after a loss to Utah in the 1995 playoffs. Clyde Drexler, who Houston had acquired in February 1995, had taken away most of Maxwell's minutes and his starting spot. The decision to quit the team is something that Maxwell has been said to regret. He was waived by the Rockets on June 1995.

He signed with the Seattle SuperSonics prior to the 1999-2000 season. In March, he got into a fight with Sonics star Gary Payton and accidentally hit Horace Grant with a 5-pound weight, when he was trying to break up the fight, injuring his Grant's shoulder and forcing him to miss the Sonics next game. Shortly before the Sonics' first round series against the Utah Jazz, it was reported that he would miss the playoffs due to a knee injury, much to the delight of Utah's players.

Behavioral incidents
 February 1995: In a game at Portland on February 6, he ran into the stands punching a fan due to the fan heckling him. The NBA suspended him for ten games and fined him $20,000.
 April 1995: Feigning a hamstring injury, he was given a leave of absence after the first game of the playoffs. Maxwell later admitted he was frustrated with not playing; the incident was hyped as Maxwell being disgruntled at the team's recent acquisition of Hall-of-Fame guard Clyde Drexler.  His actions led to the Rockets ending his tenure with them.
 August 1995: Shortly after signing with Philadelphia, Maxwell was pulled over after he ran a red light. During a search, police found a bag of marijuana on the floor of the car. Maxwell pleaded no contest and posted a $25,000 appeal bond, but lost the appeal. Three years later, while Maxwell was playing for the Charlotte Hornets, a Texas judge issued a warrant for his arrest and he was extradited to Houston, where he served a 90-day sentence.
 2000: The Seattle SuperSonics fined Maxwell and Gary Payton for a locker-room brawl on March 26, that left two of their teammates, who tried to play peacemakers, hurt.

References

External links

 Career stats
 NBA.com player profile
 "'Mad Max' threw away talent and much more" - Column by Hubert Mizell of the St. Petersburg Times

1965 births
Living people
African-American basketball players
American men's basketball players
Basketball players from Gainesville, Florida
Buchholz High School alumni
Charlotte Hornets players
Dallas Mavericks players
Denver Nuggets draft picks
Florida Gators men's basketball players
Houston Rockets players
Orlando Magic players
Philadelphia 76ers players
Point guards
Sacramento Kings players
San Antonio Spurs players
Seattle SuperSonics players
Shooting guards
21st-century African-American people
20th-century African-American sportspeople